This list of Arab Indonesians includes names of figures from ethnic Arab descent, especially Hadhrami people, in Indonesia. This list also includes the names of figures who are genetically of Arab blood, both those born in the Arab World who later migrated to Indonesia (wulayti), or who were born in Indonesia with Arab-blooded parents or Arab Indonesians mix (Muwallad).

This list does not include Walisongo descendants (who originally surnamed Azmatkhan) who have assimilated perfectly with the local residents, such as the descendants of the Sultan of Banten (who have the first names Tubagus and Ratu), Cirebon, and Palembang. While the sultans of the sultanates mentioned earlier will still be included in this list. Furthermore, Walisongo descendants who have verified their lineage up to Ahmad al-Muhajir,  through Sayyid Jumadil Kubra (Walisongo's ancestor), will still be included.

This list also includes descendants of Jafar Sadek, an Arab who spread Islam in the Maluku Islands in the 13th century, who became sultans in several kingdoms in Maluku such as Ternate and Tidore. And descendants of Abdullah ibn Shaykh al-Aydarus, great-grandfather of Tun Habib Abdul Majid, who was the ancestor of Bendahara dynasty and sultans in Johor and Lingga.

The figures who can be verified their Arabic identity with their last name (surname or Arab clans, see ) and first name (honorific title name, such as Sayyid or Sayid, Syarif or Syarifah, Sidi, and ) will not be given a footnote.

Academics

 Faizah binti Awad, professor, rector of state islamic institute of kendari, gorontalonese, father (yemeni)

Activists

Artists

Authors

Businesspeople

Celebrities

Criminals

Freedom fighters and other historical figures

Journalists

Military and police personnel

Politicians

Central government

President
 Abdurrahman Wahid, 4th President of Indonesia (1999–2001), general chairman of Nahdlatul Ulama (1984–1999)
 B. J. Habibie, 3rd President of Indonesia (1998–1999), 7th Vice President of Indonesia (1998), 4th State Minister for Research and Technology of Indonesia (1978–1998)

Cabinet-level officers

Members of central parliamentary houses

Independent agencies and commissions officers

Provincial government

Governors and Vice Governors

Members of provincial parliament

Municipal government

Others

Religious leaders

Royal figures

Java

Kalimantan

Maluku Islands

Sumatera

Sportspeople

Explanatory notes

References

Citations

Works cited

Further reading 

 
 
 
 
 
 
 
 
 
 
 
 

Arab descent

List
Arab Indonesians